Powell, formerly known as Powell Station, is a census-designated place in Knox County, Tennessee, United States. The area is located in the Emory Road corridor (State Route 131), just north of Knoxville, southeast of Clinton, and east of Oak Ridge. It had a population of 13,802 during the 2020 census. It is included in the Knoxville, Tennessee Metropolitan Statistical Area.

History

Despite its status as unincorporated, Powell is considered to be more of an "independent" small town than a suburb. One of the reasons behind this is that it was established in 1789 (two years before the establishment of Knoxville) by settlers passing through East Tennessee into the frontier. Among these early settlers was Stockley Donelson (1753–1804), a brother-in-law of President Andrew Jackson.  Donelson's home, now known as the Alexander Bishop House, still stands on Bishop Lane. Another early settler was John Manifee, a Revolutionary War veteran who built a small fort and trading station along what is now Clinton Highway in the late 1780s.

The community's name is derived from the Powell Station train stop, which was in turn named for Columbus Powell, a prominent local resident. The train station is not currently in use but remains in the town's "downtown" area. The railroad was essential to economy of early 20th century Powell as bricks were made with the mud from Beaver Creek and loaded onto the tracks and sent to various locations. The tracks were originally part of the East Tennessee, Virginia and Georgia Railway (now part of the Norfolk Southern line).

From 1951 to 2012, Powell was home to the Powell STOLport, a rural airstrip located adjacent to the I-75 and Emory Road (SR 131) interchange. In March 2013, following the Knoxville City Council's annexation of the airstrip site, the Knoxville-Knox County Metropolitan Planning Commission approved plans for a shopping complex on the site including a Kroger supermarket, Regal Cinemas theater, Kohl's department store, and other retail developments.

Geography
Powell lies in the Beaver Creek Valley between Copper Ridge and Beaver Ridge, two narrow ridges typical of the Ridge-and-Valley Appalachians.  It is situated along Emory Road (SR 131) about halfway between Halls and Karns, and roughly spans the area between Interstate 75 to the east, and Clinton Highway (U.S. Route 25W) to the west.  Knoxville lies opposite Beaver Ridge to the southeast.

Demographics

Economy
 The Weigel's chain of convenience stores started and is still headquartered in Powell.
 The largest employer in Powell is DeRoyal Industries, which manufactures and markets medical products.
 Powell was home to a Levi's jeans manufacturing plant that closed in 2002.  The former Levi's property, adjacent to DeRoyal Industries, is now the site of Crown College.

Infrastructure
Powell is serviced by the Hallsdale-Powell Utility District and the Knoxville Utilities Board, for wastewater, municipal water, and electricity respectively.

Education
Public schools in Powell, operated by Knox County Schools, are:
Powell High School
Powell Middle School
Powell Elementary School
Brickey-McCloud Elementary School
Copper Ridge Elementary School

Religious-based educational institutions in the community include:
First Baptist Academy
Crown College
Temple Baptist Academy

Powell is well-noted throughout Knox County for its intense support of Powell High School Panther athletics. Powell High School constructed a new football stadium in 2009 and the football team is sponsored by Nike. The Panthers were Tennessee State Runners-Up in 1991 and 2011.

Religion

Temple Baptist Church is a church located at 1700 Beaver Creek Drive in Powell.

First Baptist Church is located at 7706 Ewing Road in Powell.

Many other smaller churches such as One Life-North, Powell Presbyterian, and Bells Camground Baptist are also located in Powell.

Notable people
 John Bruhin, Tampa Bay Buccaneers guard
 Archie Campbell, comedian, and a regular on Hee Haw is buried near Powell
 John Cooper, ESPN college football analyst, member of the College Football Hall of Fame
 Walter Nolen, football player
 Lee Smith, NFL tight end

In literature
The central action of James Agee's Pulitzer Prize winning memoir, A Death in the Family, takes place in Powell.

References

External links
Powell Community Club's former informational website

Unincorporated communities in Tennessee
Unincorporated communities in Knox County, Tennessee
Knoxville metropolitan area
Populated places established in 1789
1789 establishments in North Carolina